MOTW or MotW may refer to:
 Mark of the Wolves, a 1999 fighting game
 Maudlin of the Well, an American metal band
 Memory of the World Programme, a UNESCO initiative
 Men of the World, a British situation comedy
 Monster of the week, a one-use antagonist in episodic fiction
 Movie of the week, a television film
 Music of the World, a record label
 Men on the Work, a revolutionary movement
 "MOTW", a song by Gunna from the album Wunna